The 5th IAAF World Half Marathon Championships was held on September 29, 1996, in Palma de Mallorca, Spain. A total of 206 athletes, 134 men and 72 women, from 53 countries took part.

Complete results were published.

Medallists

Race results

Men's

Women's

(1:12:37), but disqualified later.  From 2 May 1999, the IAAF imposed a
life ban on her.

Team results

Men's

Women's

Participation
The participation of 206 athletes (134 men/72 women) from 53 countries is reported.

 (1)
 (4)
 (1)
 (1)
 (7)
 (2)
 (5)
 (1)
 (5)
 (1)
 (5)
 (2)
 (3)
 (3)
 (1)
 (1)
 (9)
 (9)
 (3)
 (6)
 (2)
 (1)
 (1)
 (6)
 (4)
 (9)
 (7)
 (2)
 (5)
 (3)
 (3)
 (8)
 (1)
 (1)
 (3)
 (2)
 (5)
 (9)
 (4)
 (8)
 (10)
 (1)
 (1)
 (2)
 (3)
 (2)
 (7)
 (9)
 (10)
 (1)
 (2)
 (1)
 (3)

See also
 1996 in athletics (track and field)

References

External links
IAAF World Half Marathon Championships 1992-2005 Facts & Figures

IAAF World Half Marathon Championships
Half Marathon Championships
IAAF World Half Marathon Championships
World Athletics Half Marathon Championships
International athletics competitions hosted by Spain